William Frey  could refer to:

William C. Frey (1919–1979), American jurist
William H. Frey, American demographer
William Frey (bishop) (born 1930), American Episcopal bishop